Koosick Bluff is a volcanic bluff in Cassiar Land District (Stikine Country) in northern British Columbia, Canada. It is located in Mount Edziza Provincial Park and Recreation Area, just northwest of Cocoa Crater and southwest of Mount Edziza.

See also
List of volcanoes in Canada
Volcanism in Canada
Volcanism in Western Canada

References

Mountains of British Columbia
Mount Edziza volcanic complex
Pleistocene volcanism